A phytosome is a complex of a natural active ingredient and a phospholipid - mostly lecithin.

It is claimed that phytosome increases absorption of "conventional herbal extracts" or isolated active principles both topically as well as orally.

Complexation with phospholipids has been applied to a number of popular herbal extracts and active molecules including Ginkgo biloba extract, bilobalide isolated from Ginkgo biloba, silybin isolated from milk thistle (Silybum marianum), curcumin isolated from turmeric, and green tea extract (Camellia sinensis).

An attempt to trademark the term in the USA failed on appeal. Legal analysis in the USA held "...Applicant's fatal error, according to the Board, was in using the term as the sole designation for its new product."
At least one dictionary has defined it as "a new term cosmetologists are using for the combination of liposomes ... and plant extracts."

Nevertheless, Phytosome - along with Meriva -  is a registered trademark of Indena S.p.A. in major countries.

Footnotes

Phospholipids